Walter Puddefoot was an English professional footballer who played as a goalkeeper for US Quevilly in the 1927 Coupe de France Final.

References

Year of birth missing
Year of death missing
English footballers
US Quevilly-Rouen Métropole players
Association football goalkeepers
English expatriate footballers
English expatriate sportspeople in France
Expatriate footballers in France